Freedom Wings, known in Japan as , is a flight simulator developed by Taito and published by Natsume in the US and Zoo Digital Publishing in Europe. The game combined elements of flight simulators and RPGs as players earned experience points for combat, earn money and maintain other statuses.

Story
The game takes place on an alternate Earth in an era resembling the 1940s. Air pirates have taken to the skies and have placed fear into the hearts of others worldwide. The player assumes the role of a nameless, faceless pilot whose parents were murdered by air pirates, motivating the character to join the Air Patrol Association (APA), a squadron of mercenary pilots hired to clear the skies of air pirate activity.

Gameplay
Freedom Wings features a primarily stylus based interface; players had to maintain speed, altitude, direct the plane and select all options with the stylus (although a manual maneuvering mode was optional). The rest of the plane's functions such as switching targets, firing and viewing radar screen were dependent on the DS buttons. The game forced players to limit their flying time; the longer the player stayed out flying, the more the fuel would deplete, forcing the pilot to head for the nearest friendly airfield to refuel.

From headquarters, players could save their game, take off alone or connect the game to wireless multiplayer mode. The players were urged to go to the airport café where they got new information on where larger air pirate targets were located through other characters. One major point in the game was shop where players could spend their money on new parts and equipment, (which varied depending on which airfield the player was on at the time), resulting in better combat and flight performance.

References

Notes

Sources

2006 video games
Alternate history video games
Combat flight simulators
Taito games
Nintendo DS games
Nintendo DS-only games
Flight simulation video games
Multiplayer and single-player video games
Video games developed in Japan